Aaron Howard Johnson (born February 8, 1977) is an American music producer. Aaron has produced and mixed many artists including Alpha Rev, Secondhand Serenade, Katie Herzig, Adam Jensen, and Eve6, but he is best known for producing hit albums for the Denver-based rock band the Fray.

Life and career
Johnson was born in Maryland but grew up in Southern California, attending college at the California Institute of the Arts. He lived in Denver, Colorado from 1999 to 2001, after which he moved to New York City. In 2008, Aaron returned to Southern California.  Aaron got his start "hanging out" at a studio in So Cal while still in high school. It was there that he developed an interest in making and recording music. His break came in a demo he produced and recorded for the Fray of a song called "Over My Head (Cable Car)". Aaron produced the band's debut album, How to Save a Life, and their follow up album, The Fray. On How to Save a Life, he co-wrote the fourth single, "All at Once." He has also worked with the Fray on their live albums, EPs and other material.  Aaron has been awarded multiple Platinum Records, a Billboard Music Award, and was honored as "Producer Of The Year" at the New England Music Awards in 2012.

Aaron owns the production company "Little Big Time Productions" operating out of Little Big Studio in San Clemente, CA.  He was the guitarist for the New York city-based rock band God or Julie  before taking on mixing and producing full-time.

Aaron is the brother of filmmaker Rian Johnson.

References

External links

1977 births
Record producers from Maryland
California Institute of the Arts alumni
Living people